Richard Wayne Wahlstrom (November 8, 1931 – December 18, 2003) was an American rower who competed in the 1952 Summer Olympics.

He was born in Seattle and died in Snohomish county, Washington.

In 1952 he was a crew member of the American boat which won the bronze medal in the coxed fours event.

External links
 profile

1931 births
2003 deaths
American male rowers
Rowers at the 1952 Summer Olympics
Olympic bronze medalists for the United States in rowing
American people of Swedish descent
Medalists at the 1952 Summer Olympics